Denison Township is located in Lawrence County, Illinois. As of the 2010 census, its population was 1,558 and it contained 738 housing units.

The township's name honors William Denison, a county official.

Geography

Demographics

References

External links
City-data.com
Illinois State Archives

Townships in Lawrence County, Illinois
Townships in Illinois